Am Faochagach (953 m) is a mountain in the Northwest Highlands of Scotland. It is located in Wester Ross, north of the main road to Ullapool.

A rounded peak, it is surrounded by moorland and bogs, and a river crossing, which makes the approach to the mountain difficult from the road. However, the ascent itself is simpler.

References

Mountains and hills of the Northwest Highlands
Marilyns of Scotland
Munros